The Principality of Pereyaslavl was a regional principality of Kievan Rus' from the end of 9th century until 1323, based in the city of Pereyaslavl (now Pereiaslav) on the Trubizh River.

Siting
The Principality of Pereyaslavl was usually administrated by younger sons of the Grand Prince of Kiev. It stretched over the extensive territory from the left banks of the middle Dnieper river on the west to its eastern frontier that laid not far west from the Seversky Donets, where the legendary Cuman city of Sharuk(h)an was presumably situated.

History
The Primary Chronicle dates the foundation of the city of Pereyaslavl' to 992; the archaeological evidence suggests it was founded not long after this date. In its early days Pereyaslavl' was one of the important cities in Kievan Rus' behind the Principality of Chernigov and Kiev. The city was located at a ford where Vladimir the Great fought a battle against the nomad Pechenegs.

The principality can be traced as a semi-independent dominion from the inheritance of the sons of Yaroslav the Wise, with Svyatoslav receiving Chernigov, Vsevolod getting Pereyaslavl, Smolensk going to Vyacheslav, and Vladimir-in-Volhynia going to Igor. The Primary Chronicle records that in 988 Vladimir assigned the northern lands (later associated with Pereyaslavl) to Yaroslav.

Pereyaslavl was destroyed by the Mongols in March 1239.

See also
 Prince of Pereyaslavl, for list of rulers

Notes

References

External links
 Medieval Lands Project

 
Subdivisions of Kievan Rus'